Cucuteni is a commune in Iași County, Western Moldavia, Romania, with a population of 1,446 as of 2002.  The commune is composed of four villages: Băiceni, Bărbătești, Cucuteni, and Săcărești.

Neighbouring villages and communes are Todirești (to the north), Târgu Frumos and Cotnari (to the east) and Ruginoasa (to the west). The name of Cucuteni village is derived from the Romanian word "cucută", meaning hemlock.

The Cucuteni culture artifacts

A trove of ancient artifacts was discovered in Cucuteni in 1884. It was determined that these artifacts had been produced by an ancient people whose existence and culture had previously been unknown to modern scholars. Those scholars named the newly discovered ancient culture the Cucuteni culture, after the name of the village in which artifacts of that culture had first been discovered.

In Cucuteni village there is an archeological museum displaying artifacts of the Cucuteni culture, as well as a church built in the 15th century during the rule of Stephen III of Moldavia. The Archaeological Reserve of Cucuteni is under the direct coordination of Moldavia's History Museum.

Natives
Ioan Arbore
Ghiță Moscu
Ilie Moscovici
Petru Poni

Gallery

Legend
Cucuteni is the legendary place of birth of the legendary mathematician Nicolas Bourbaki.

References

External links

Archaeological sites in Romania
Communes in Iași County
Localities in Western Moldavia
Archaeological type sites